The 1892 Currie Cup was the first edition of the Currie Cup, the premier domestic rugby union competition in South Africa.

Log

Fixtures and Results

Source of results.

See also

 Currie Cup

References

1892
1892 in South African rugby union
Currie